Brown HT, also called Chocolate Brown HT, Food Brown 3, and C.I. 20285, is a brown synthetic coal tar diazo dye.

When used as a food dye, its E number is E155. It is used to substitute cocoa or caramel as a colorant. It is used mainly in chocolate cakes, but can also be found in desserts, cookies, candy, cheeses, teas, yogurts, jams, chocolate drinks, ice creams, fruit products, fish, wafers, breakfast cereals, and other products.

It is approved for use by the European Union.  It is banned in Australia, Austria, Belgium, Denmark, France, Germany, Norway, Sweden, Switzerland, and the United States.

References

Food colorings
Azo dyes
Organic sodium salts
Naphthalenesulfonates
Resorcinols
Primary alcohols
E-number additives